Life on Mars refers to the scientific investigation on the possibility of microbial life (past or present) on the planet Mars.

Life on Mars may also refer to:

Film and TV
Life on Mars (British TV series), a British television drama
Life on Mars (American TV series), an American remake of the British television drama
Life on Mars (South Korean TV series), a Korean remake of the British television drama
La Chica de Ayer (TV series), a Spanish remake of the British television drama
The Dark Side of the Moon (TV series), a Russian remake of the British television drama
Svět pod hlavou, a Czech remake of the British television drama
"Life on Mars" (The West Wing), an episode of The West Wing

Music
"Life on Mars" (song), a 1971 song by David Bowie from Hunky Dory
Life on Mars, an album by Dexter Wansel or the title track
Life on Mars, an album by The Veronicas

Other uses
 Life on Mars (poetry collection), a 2011 book by Tracy K. Smith
 Lego Life on Mars, a LEGO set brick collection from 2001

See also
 
 
Live from Mars, a 2001 live album by Ben Harper & the Innocent Criminals
Martian, a hypothetical or fictional inhabitant of Mars
Colonization of Mars
 Life (disambiguation)
 Mars (disambiguation)